Sang-e-Mah (Urdu: سنگِ ماہ) is a Pakistani television series, and second series in the trilogy preceded by Sang-e-Mar Mar. Having central plot line inspired from William Shakespeare's Hamlet, it is written by Mustafa Afridi, directed by Saife Hassan and produced by Momina Duraid under her banner production MD Productions. The series revolves around the mysteries that unfold when a young man Hilmand decides to avenge the murder of his father. It focuses on the oppression of women in the form of 'ghag' in tribal areas and also deals with interreligious harmony. It features Atif Aslam, Sania Saeed, Nauman Ijaz, Samiya Mumtaz, Hania Amir, Kubra Khan, Zaviyar Nauman Ijaz and Omair Rana in pivotal roles. The serial marks the television acting debut of Atif Aslam who played the main role of Hilmand Khan.

The series had a cinematic launch on 8 January 2022, while it premiere on Hum TV on 9 January. The series received praise from critics due to its script but was faulted for stereotypical portrayals of Pakhtoons.

Premise 
A transcendent tale of love and retribution.

Sang-e-Mah follows the story of a family who belong to the tribal regions of Pakistan. The drama will reveal how people have to sacrifice their lives and love because of an untruthful tradition.

Plot 

The story is set in the fictional town of 'Laspiraan'. Hilmand (Atif Aslam) usually spends time at the grave of his father, Nasrullah Khan. Hilmand wants to get revenge on Haji Marjaan Khan (Nauman Ijaz) because Hilmand believes Marjaan killed Nasrullah to marry Hilmand's mother Zarsanga (Samiya Mumtaz). Zarsanga and Marjaan's son and Hilmand's half-brother, Hikmat (Zaviyar Nauman Ijaz), is in love with his cousin Gul Meena (Hania Amir), daughter of Zarsanga's sister Zarghuna (Sania Saeed).

Zarghuna hates Mastan Singh (Omair Rana), since Mastan killed Zarghuna's husband Asadullah Khan. Zarghuna rejects Hikmat and Gul Meena's relationship, so Hikmat goes to do "Ghag", where he will go to Gul Meena's house and make an announcement that Gul Meena can only be Hikmat's bride. But, Zarghuna discovers that Hilmand did the Ghag instead. Mastan goes to kill Hilmand, but is stopped due to his father's death. It is revealed that Mastan's father, Hakeem Guru Baksh, gave Marjaan poison to kill Nasrullah.

Meanwhile, Sheherzaad (Kubra Khan) learns about the Ghag and comes to Laspiraan to gather research, since Sheherzaad is a reporter. When she comes to Laspiraan, she and Marjaan start bonding and she meets Hilmand, who gives Sheherzaad his blanket. Sheherzaad then remembers being harassed by her cousin Haider (Shamil Khan) when she was young. Mastan finds Hilmand and stabs him, but at the hospital, Haider and Sheherzaad reunite since Haider is now a doctor.

After seeing Haider, Sheherzaad uses the nurse's help to move Hilmand somewhere else for safety. It is also revealed that Marjaan got Zarghuna married to his servant, Awal Khan (Syed Muntazim Shah). But when he was abusive towards her, she divorced him and married Asadullah, who was Awal Khan's younger brother. Seeing Sheherzaad as his daughter, Marjaan goes to Haider's house and tells his wife the truth about Sheherzaad's past with Haider. The nurse leaks this to the hospital and Haider is arrested.

After Hilmand recovers, he calls a "jirga" (meeting) for Hikmat being responsible for the attack on Hilmand, even though Hilmand knows Mastan did the attack. Hilmand threatens Mastan to testify against Marjaan so Hilmand can get his revenge against Marjaan, but if Mastan doesn't, Hilmand won't let Mastan get married. So, Mastan's fiancée Harshaali Kaur (Najiba Faiz) convinces Mastan to do what Hilmand says.

At the jirga, Hilmand says Hikmat didn't do anything and Mastan says when his father was dying, he didn't say anything about giving Marjaan poison to kill Nasrullah, but he said for Mastan to get married. Mastan also reveals that he attacked Hilmand. Zarsanga decides to go the jirga herself and decides to tell the truth there, with Sheherzaad running after her.

At the jirga, after failing to produce evidence against Marjaan, Hilmand asks Marjaan to say under oath on the hand of Shah Sab that he did not kill Nasrullah. Marjaan proceeds to do so but the moment he was to say the words, Zarsanga appears and stops Marjaan. Marjaan asks Zarsanga to go but she refuses to leave. Hilmand goes to meet her mother and tells her that Marjaan killed his father and her husband. At that moment Zarsanga reveals that she killed Nasrullah. Hilmand runs into the forests after listening that and everyone in the jirga are shocked.

Hilmand goes to his father's village to verify what his mother has revealed as he feels that she had lied to save Marjaan. But after meeting Mashallah Khan (Asif Khan), his grandfather, the true character of his father is revealed and he is broken. Mashallah Khan on the other hand, intrigued at Hilmand's coming to meet him after all these years, send his sons to Laspiraan to know  the reason. He gets to know about the confession of Zarsanga and now starts plotting to extract hefty amounts from Marjaan. On the other hand, Sheherzaad is looking frantically looking for Hilmand. She implores him to accompany her to the city but he is completely broken and leaves the place.

Mashallah then calls another jirga on Zarsanga for killing his son Nasrullah. Zarsanga tells Sheherzaad she doesn't want to attend the jirga. The day before the jirga, Marjaan gives his turban to Hikmat, saying he should make a decision which can give everyone justice and which can save Zarsanga's respect and also making Hikmat the new Haji and the new leader of Laspiraan. At the jirga, Hikmat comes wearing the turban in Marjaan's place. Then, Zarghuna, Sheherzaad, Gul Meena, and all the other women in Laspiraan suffering Ghag arrive at the jirga.

Gul Meena then shares her Ghag story, when Hilmand arrives. Mashallah Khan says he wants a share in some money for Zarsanga's death because he wants blood for blood. But, Hilmand reveals papers for some land so he asks for a whole share and all the money from Mashallah, so he and his sons leave in silence, and the elders decide to put an end to Ghag immediately, and whoever does Ghag after this will be punished immediately. Hilmand reveals to Hikmat that the papers were fake. 

Hilmand and Sheherzaad come home to find Marjaan and Zarsanga lying dead together. The night before, Marjaan and Zarsanga both decided to kill themselves to save themselves from embarrassment. Hilmand comforts a crying Sheherzaad. 

A few years later, an elderly Awal Khan asks a young kid named Marjaan Khan where his father is. The young Marjaan points Awal Khan to where his father is and Awal Khan tells him that Mashallah Khan's sons have done Ghag again. The father is revealed to be Hilmand, who is now Haji Hilmand Khan, and he turns around and looks at Awal Khan, implying that Hilmand will give his uncles a good punishment.

Cast

Production 
In July 2021, Saife Hassan announced in an exclusive interview that he is going to revamp the Sang-e-Mar Mar with a new season. He revealed the Sania Saeed, Nauman Ijaz, Kubra Khan and Samiya Mumtaz as leading actors. Hassan also announced that it will be a trilogy and after Sang-e-Mah, he will make Sang-e-Siyah.

Sania Saeed, Nauman Ijaz and Kubra Khan respire their roles from Sang-e-Mar Mar while Nadia Afgan, Hania Amir and Samiya Mumtaz joined for second season. There were also rumours of the singer Atif Aslam to be part of the series; his casting confirmed in late August 2021. Before Aslam, film actor Bilal Ashraf has been cast for the lead role of "Hilmamd" however, he turned down the project due to date conflicts. Previously, the role has been rejected by Ali Zafar and Fawad Khan due to unknown reasons. While discussing about the story, Hassan revealed that the first part of the trilogy will focus on Pakhtoon family issues and will also tackle problematic traditions such as forced marriages.

The first teaser of the series was released on 10 December 2021.

Although, the production location of the series is Bhogarmang Valley located near Balakot where shooting was done extensively, some of the initial sequences were filmed in the Gurdwara of Nankana Sahib.

Soundtrack

The official soundtrack of the series is performed by Atif Aslam on the lyrics of Fatima Najeeb with music composition by Sahir Ali Bagga.

Reception  
In late December 2021, the series received appraisal for its teasers which, promising a powerful story with larger than life characters and touch of Shakespearean tragedy. The serial had views of all teasers and trailers were as high as 8.3 Million. The News while reviewing the first episode praised the storyline and characterisation stating that, series features an intriguing storyline and convincing characterisation. In another article, the newspaper praised the dialogues of the series by describing them as, "powerful and impactful." On premiere, the series received mixed reviews with criticism towards the stereotypical portrayal of Pakhtoons but in later episodes it disappeared. Mehreen Odho of DAWN Images compared it with Shakespeare's Hamlet and praised its writing and characterisation. The on-screen chemistry of Aslam and Khan was also praised heavily.

Television ratings

YouTube Views
As of 29th July, 2022, the first episode generated 24 Million views and last episode had generated 8.2 Million views, the in total views of all episodes are 246.1 Million views as of 29th July, 2022.

Broadcast
The show is distributed worldwide by the following T.V. channels
 HUM TV (South Asia)
 HUM TV Mena
 HUM World

Notes

References

External links 
 
 

2022 Pakistani television series debuts
Urdu-language television shows
Hum TV original programming
Pakistani drama television series